Thomas Maitland may refer to:
 Thomas Maitland, Lord Dundrennan (1792–1851), Scottish judge
 Thomas Maitland (British Army officer) (1760–1824), British general
 Thomas Maitland, 11th Earl of Lauderdale (1803–1878), Royal Navy officer and peer